The Olímpia Tennis Classic is a professional tennis tournament played on clay courts. It is currently part of the ATP Challenger Tour. It is held annually in Olímpia, Brazil since 2020.

Past finals

Singles

Doubles

References

ATP Challenger Tour
Clay court tennis tournaments
Tennis tournaments in Brazil
2020 establishments in Brazil
Recurring sporting events established in 2020